Hugo Christiansen (born 5 July 1940) is a Danish rower. He competed in the men's coxless four event at the 1960 Summer Olympics.

References

1940 births
Living people
Danish male rowers
Olympic rowers of Denmark
Rowers at the 1960 Summer Olympics
Rowers from Copenhagen